The 2012–13 season is Fulham's 115th professional season and their 12th consecutive season in the top flight of English football, the Premier League. They will also compete in the League Cup and the FA Cup.

First team squad
As of 19 May 2013

Source:BBC Sport

Transfers

Transfers in

Loans in

Transfers out

Loans out

Overall transfer activity

Spending
Summer:  £8,000,000

Winter:  £0

Total:  £8,000,000

Income
Summer:  £23,000,000

Winter:  £0

Total:  £23,000,000

Expenditure
Summer:  £15,000,000

Winter:  £0

Total:  £15,000,000

Competitions

Overall

Premier League table

Results summary

League performance

Fixtures and results

Pre-season

Premier League

Football League Cup

FA Cup

Squad statistics

Appearances & goals
Last updated 19 May 2013

|-
|colspan="12"|Players who are no longer playing for Fulham or who have been loaned out:

|}

Top scorers
Includes all competitive matches. The list is sorted by squad number when total goals are equal.

Last updated on 19 May 2013

a.  The Premier League's Dubious Goals Panel ruled that Fulham's first goal against Everton on 3 November 2012 was in fact a Bryan Ruiz goal and therefore has not been credited as an own goal by Tim Howard.

Disciplinary record
Includes all competitive matches. The list is sorted by position, and then shirt number.

Suspensions

Notes

References

Fulham F.C. seasons
Fulham